Negro Creek is a creek located in the East Kootenay region of British Columbia.  Formerly named Nigger Creek, the name was changed in 1961.   The creek flows into the Moyie River and was discovered in the 1860s.  This creek has been mined by both Europeans and Chinese miners.

References

Rivers of British Columbia